Bawaman Mosque (also, Bava Man's Masjid) is a mosque in Champaner, western India. It is situated on the western side of one of the ancient city's fort gates, within the Champaner-Pavagadh Archaeological Park of Gujarat.

History
The mosque is named after Bawaman (or Bava Man), who was revered as a saint in Baroda. Bawaman was  a follower of Sadan Shah, whose tomb is enshrined within the Kalika Mata Temple at the summit of Pavagadh Hill, which is also within the Archaeological Park. The mosque was built during the time of Mahmud Begada, as were several other masjids in the area, such as the Jama, Kevada, Ek Minar, Khajuri, Nagina, and Shahar Ki.

While many structural elements are worn or damaged, the Archaeological Survey of India (ASI) reported in 1985 that restoration work was in progress, such as removing dead lime concrete material from the roof, as well as resetting loose stones in the arches. ASI reports of 2006 indicate that extensive restoration works of many heritage monuments were carried out at the Bawana Mosque and also at the Jami Masjid, fort walls, Kevada Masjid, Lila Gumbaj Ki Masjid, Sikandar Shah Tomb and Sikander tomb, which resulted in a slight increase in tourist traffic to the sites. ASI had already spent Rs 2.25 crores (about US$0.45 million) on the conservation activity in a four-year period and a further Rs 1.15 crores (US$0.23 million) was allotted for more restoration works at the sites. A follow-up report in 2009 described extensive conservation work subsequent to earthquake damage.

Architecture and fittings

Built on a raised platform with a high plinth, its features include a minaret which stands out above the trees, three large domes, three mihrabs on the rear wall, and three arched entrances. There are also ablution tanks close to the building.

See also
 Monuments of Champaner-Pavagadh Archaeological Park

References

Mosques in Champaner
Champaner-Pavagadh Archaeological Park
15th-century mosques
Monuments of National Importance in Gujarat